Hanerau-Hademarschen is a municipality in the district of Rendsburg-Eckernförde, in Schleswig-Holstein, Germany. It is situated near the Kiel Canal, approx. 25 km southwest of Rendsburg.

Hanerau-Hademarschen was until 2008 the seat of the Amt ("collective municipality") Hanerau-Hademarschen. Now the seat of the Amt is Hohenwestedt which is outside the area of Hanerau-Hademarschen.

Notable people 

 Theodor Storm (1817–1888), German writer (1880–1888 in Hademarschen)
 Ingo Kühl (* 1953), German painter, sculptor and architect (1964–1973 in Hademarschen)

References

Rendsburg-Eckernförde